2-Iodobenzoic acid,  or o-iodobenzoic acid, is an organic compound with the formula IC6H4COOH. The synthesis of 2-iodobenzoic acid via the diazotization of anthranilic acid is commonly performed in university organic chemistry labs. One of its most common uses is as a precursor for the preparation of IBX and Dess–Martin periodinane, both used as mild oxidants.

Synthesis 
2-Iodobenzoic acid can be synthesized by a Sandmeyer reaction: the diazotization of anthranilic acid followed by a reaction with iodide.

See also
4-Iodobenzoic acid

References

Benzoic acids
Iodoarenes